The 2003 Maidstone Borough Council election took place on 1 May 2003 to elect members of Maidstone Borough Council in Kent, England. One third of the council was up for election and the council stayed under no overall control.

After the election, the composition of the council was:
Liberal Democrat 21
Conservative 21
Labour 10
Independent 3

Background
Before the election no party had a majority on the council with the Liberal Democrats on 21 seats, the Conservatives 19, Labour 12 and 3 independents. The Conservatives stood in all 18 seats which were being contested, the Liberal Democrat and Labour parties each put up 17 candidates, the United Kingdom Independence Party 10 and there were 2 independent candidates.

Election result
Overall turnout in the election was 30.8%.

Ward results

References

2003 English local elections
2003
2000s in Kent